is a passenger railway station located in the city of Kishiwada, Osaka Prefecture, Japan, operated by the private railway operator Nankai Electric Railway. It has the station number "NK22".

Lines

Layout
The station consists of one island platform and one side platform.The platforms are independent of one another, and passengers wishing to change platforms must exit and re-enter the station. There are two tracks for maintenance in the west of track 3.

Platforms

Adjacent stations

History
Haruki Station opened on 18 October 1914.

Passenger statistics
In fiscal 2019, the station was used by an average of 14,736 passengers daily.

Surrounding area
 Kishiwada Cycle Racing Track
 Kishiwada Medical Center
 Madoka Hall, Central Park, Kishiwada Gymnasium
 Osaka District Court Kishiwada Branch, Osaka District Court Kishiwada Branch, Kishiwada Summary Court

See also
 List of railway stations in Japan

References

External links

  

Railway stations in Japan opened in 1914
Railway stations in Osaka Prefecture
Kishiwada, Osaka